Switzer Unlimited is a Canadian talk show television series which aired on CBC Television in 1976.

Premise
This series was broadcast as a temporary replacement for The Bob McLean Show from August, following the conclusion of CBC's broadcast efforts for the 1976 Summer Olympics in Montreal.

Regular participants included Bill Alexander (artist), Guy Bannerman (broadcaster), Phyllis Coleman (yoga), Doug Collins (journalist), Mike Halleran (environment), Uno Langman (antiques), Barry Leach (environment), Peter Lenak (lawyer), John Lindenlaub (outdoor cooking), Hannah Smith (graphology) and David Tarrant (gardening).

Scheduling
This hour-long series was broadcast Monday through Friday at 12:00 p.m. (Eastern time) from 2 August to 3 September 1976.

References

External links
 

1976 Canadian television series debuts
1976 Canadian television series endings
CBC Television original programming